Baudoin is a surname related to Baldwin. Notable people with the name include:

 Edmond Baudoin (born 1942), French artist, illustrator, and writer of sequential art and graphic novels
 Gervais Baudoin (1686–1752), Canadian surgeon
 Giuseppe Baudoin (1843–1896), Italian major
 Jean Baudoin (1662–1698), French missionary and chaplain
 Jean Baudoin (translator) (1590–1650), French translator
 Jean-Baptiste Baudoin (1831–1875), French Catholic priest and missionary in Iceland
 Louis Alexis Baudoin (1776–1805), French Navy officer and captain
 Magela Baudoin (born 1973), Bolivian author
Mario Baudoin (1942–2019), Bolivian biologist 

Notable people with Baudoin as a given name include:

 Baudoin Kanda (born 1993), Romanian footballer

Baudoin Liwanga Mata (born 1950), Congolese military figure and politician

See also
 Beaudoin
Baudouin (disambiguation)